Polish-Studies.Interdisciplinary (Pol-Int) is a free online platform for information on and international exchange in the field of Polish studies. The platform was launched in 2014 and serves as a tool for a growing interdisciplinary community of scholars worldwide to promote their own research and publications in Polish studies. Users can publish reviews, share information about conferences, events, and career opportunities as well as connect and engage in discussions on current issues. Pol-Int is headed by Dagmara Jajeśniak-Quast and based at the Center for Interdisciplinary Polish Studies (ZIP) at the European University Viadrina in Frankfurt (Oder) and at the Collegium Polonicum in Słubice. The platform is co-financed by the Foundation for Polish-German Cooperation, the Polish-German Foundation for Science, the European University Viadrina and the European Regional Development Fund.

Profile 
Pol-Int offers up-to-date information on Polish studies worldwide: publications, journals and articles, reviews, job offers (including scholarships and grants), events, conference reports, and calls for papers. Anyone interested in the field of Polish studies can register, set up an individual profile, as well as publish and obtain information, share and promote their own research projects, and find project partners. Thus, Pol-Int serves as a networking tool for scholars dealing with Poland past and present, its culture, society, economy, and so forth.

All posts on the platform are further disseminated through a customizable newsletter. The platform is based on and prospers from the commitment and active participation of its academic community.

In 2016, Pol-Int launched the academic blog “Salon” – a separate space within the platform to discuss current pressing issues in Poland, to debate them at expert meetings, such as panel discussions, and to later publish the results in articles, reviews and interviews online. The “Salon” is meant to bridge the gap between the traditional analogue and the digital sphere of contemporary research, in order to promote exchange between both realms.

Editorial board 
The editorial board is based in Frankfurt (Oder). Thanks to an expanding cooperation with more than 100 voluntary specialist editors from over 25 academic disciplines who peer-review texts before publication, Pol-Int publishes reviews in Polish, English and German. The editorial board reviews more than 150 recently published monographs or anthologies and academic articles per year and coordinates the workflow with the specialist editors and reviewers. All publications on Pol-Int are required and certified to maintain the level of renowned academic journals.

Partners 
The platform is supported by numerous academic partner institutions from Poland, Germany, the USA, and the UK:
 Aleksander Brückner Center for Polish Studies
 Archiwum Karla Dedeciusa
 Center for Interdisciplinary Polish Studies
 Centre for Historical Research of the Polish Academy of Sciences in Berlin
 Collegium Polonicum
 Cosmopolitan Review
 Deutsches Polen-Institut
 East Central European Center of the Columbia University
 European University Viadrina
 Faculty of International and Political Studies, University of Łódź
 Geisteswissenschaftliches Zentrum Geschichte und Kultur Ostmitteleuropas
 Governmental Research Institute – Silesian Institute in Opole
 Herder-Institut für historische Ostmitteleuropaforschung
 H-Soz-Kult
 Institute for Western Affairs
 Institute of History, University of Warsaw
 Institute of Political Studies of the Polish Academy of Sciences
 Instytut Filologii Polskiej, Uniwersytet Pedagogiczny w Krakowie
 Ośrodek Badań nad Mediami
 Polish Historical Association, Kraków
 Museum of Polish History
 Polish Studies Association
 Polsko-Niemiecki Instytut Badawczy
 Programme on Modern Poland, St. Antony's College, University of Oxford
 Projekt Nauka. Fundacja na rzecz promocji nauki polskiej
 Viadrina Center B/ORDERS IN MOTION
 Willy Brandt Center for German and European Studies
 Wydział Politologii i Studiów Międzynarodowych Uniwersytetu Mikołaja Kopernika w Toruniu

References

External links 
 Polish-Studies.Interdisciplinary (Pol-Int)

Polish studies
Academic publishing
Digital humanities
Open access (publishing)